George Mathers, 1st Baron Mathers KT, PC, DL (28 February 1886 – 26 September 1965) was a Scottish trade unionist and Labour Party politician. He served as Comptroller of the Household from 1944 to 1945 in Winston Churchill's war-time coalition government and as Treasurer of the Household (Deputy Chief Whip) from 1945 to 1946 in Clement Attlee's post-war Labour administration.

Background and education
Mathers was born in Newtown St Boswells, Roxburghshire, the son of George Mathers, JP, and Annie, daughter of James Barclay. He was educated at the Newtown St Boswells School.

Early working life and trade unionism
From 1899 Mathers served as a clerk with the North British Railway. He was active in the trade union and labour movement from 1908, becoming President of the Carlisle Trades Council and Labour Party from 1917 to 1920. He was elected a member of Carlisle City Council in 1919, before transferring to Edinburgh in 1921.

Political career
Mathers was Chairman of Edinburgh Central Independent Labour Party and President of the Edinburgh Branch of the Scottish Home Rule Association. He unsuccessfully contested Edinburgh West in 1923 and 1924 before being elected as Member of Parliament (MP) for the seat in 1929. He lost his seat in 1931 but was returned for Linlithgowshire in 1935. He continued to hold the seat (renamed West Lothian in 1950) until he stood down at the 1951 general election.

Mathers was Parliamentary Private Secretary (PPS) to the Under-Secretary of State for India from July 1929, and transferred to same position with the Under-Secretary of State for the Colonies in November of that year (Drummond Shiels held both positions). From 1935 to 1945 he was a Scottish Labour Whip. He entered the government under Winston Churchill as Comptroller of the Household in October 1944, a post he held until the coalition government was disbanded in May 1945. When Labour came to power under Clement Attlee in July 1945, he was appointed Treasurer of the Household (Deputy Chief Whip), which he remained until April the following year. He was sworn of the Privy Council in 1947 and raised to the peerage as Baron Mathers, of Newtown St Boswells in the County of Roxburgh, on 30 January 1952, in recognition of his "political and public services". This was the last hereditary peerage created on the recommendation of a Labour Prime Minister.

Mathers was also Lord High Commissioner to the General Assembly of the Church of Scotland in 1946, 1947, 1948 and 1951, and was appointed a deputy lieutenant of Edinburgh in 1946. In 1956 he was appointed a Knight of the Thistle.

Personal life
Lord Mathers married firstly Edith Mary, daughter of William Robinson, in 1916. After her death in June 1938 he married secondly Jessie, daughter of George Graham, in 1940. He died in September 1965, aged 79, when the barony became extinct.

References

External links 
 

1886 births
1965 deaths
Councillors in Cumbria
Deputy Lieutenants of Edinburgh
Knights of the Thistle
Labour Party (UK) hereditary peers
Lords High Commissioner to the General Assembly of the Church of Scotland
Members of the Parliament of the United Kingdom for Edinburgh constituencies
Members of the Privy Council of the United Kingdom
Ministers in the Attlee governments, 1945–1951
Ministers in the Churchill wartime government, 1940–1945
Scottish Labour MPs
Transport Salaried Staffs' Association-sponsored MPs
Treasurers of the Household
UK MPs 1929–1931
UK MPs 1935–1945
UK MPs 1945–1950
UK MPs 1950–1951
UK MPs who were granted peerages
Barons created by George VI
Parliamentary Peace Aims Group